University School of Biotechnology (USBT) is a constituent institute of Guru Gobind Singh Indraprastha University. The school offers a full-time Bachelor of Technology, Master of Engineering, as well as PhD programs.

History

Founded in 1999, University School of Biotechnology (USBT) was established by Government of Delhi as one of 12 University Schools of Studies under the Guru Gobind Singh Indraprastha University. The school has recently transferred to Dwarka Campus of the university. The University School of Biotechnology ranked third all over India after National Dairy Research Institute of Karnal and Department of Biochemical Engineering & Biotechnology, IIT Delhi.

Programs offered
USBT began with a five and half year integrated course of BTech/MTech with eleven semesters and PhD program. But from the academic session 2004-2005 onwards, the MTech program has been delinked from the BTech program and the two program are being offered under dual degree program – BTech/MTech dual degree course and separate MTech program in different fields of biotechnology. As like other major institutes of India, admission in USBT is done strictly according to the merit-based on 'All India Common Entrance Test of GGSIPU'. Students with physics, chemistry, mathematics, biology or biotechnology during senior school are eligible for the entrance exam. An overwhelming demand for Biotechnology professionals led to an increase in seats from 30 to 45 in the academic session 2006–07 and further in 2009–10.

USBT offers following programs:-
BTech/MTech – 5  Years for Integrated program
BTech 4 Years program
PhD – minimum 2 years

See also
Guru Gobind Singh Indraprastha University
Education in Delhi
Mahesh Verma

References

Biotechnology organizations
Constituent schools of Guru Gobind Singh Indraprastha University
Educational institutions established in 1999
Engineering colleges in Delhi
Organizations established in 1999
1999 establishments in Delhi